Stefan Chmielecki (died 1630) was a Polish noble of Chmieleccy noble family and voivode of Kiev (1629–1630). He was married to Teofila Chmielecka. He used Chmielecki's family crest: Bończa coat of arms

Bibliography
Władysław A. Serczyk, Na dalekiej Ukrainie. Dzieje Kozaczyzny do 1648 roku, Kraków - Wrocław 1984.

Secular senators of the Polish–Lithuanian Commonwealth
17th-century Polish nobility

Births circa 1580
1630 deaths

Year of birth uncertain